Sumbul Siddiqui (born 1988) is an American lawyer and politician, serving as the 77th mayor of Cambridge, Massachusetts. Siddiqui was elected mayor in 2020 by the Cambridge City Council, after serving in the body for 3 years. She succeeded Marc C. McGovern in January 2020, becoming the first Muslim mayor in Massachusetts history.

Early life
Siddiqui was born in Karachi, Pakistan in 1988. She immigrated to the United States from Pakistan when she was two years old, with her parents and twin brother. Her family moved to Cambridge after receiving a lottery spot in Cambridge's affordable housing system. Siddiqui was raised in Rindge Towers in North Cambridge and Roosevelt Towers in East Cambridge. She attended schools in the Cambridge Public School District and graduated from Cambridge Rindge and Latin School in 2006.

Siddiqui attended Brown University, where she was involved in the university's South Asian Students Association. She graduated from Brown in 2010 with a Bachelor of Arts in public policy and American institutions. Siddiqui later attended the Northwestern University Pritzker School of Law, graduating in 2014 with a JD.

Career

As mayor
In January 2020, Marc C. McGovern announced that he would not seek re-election and endorsed fellow council member Sumbul Siddiqui as his successor. Siddiqui was sworn in on January 6, 2020.

Mayor’s Disaster Relief Fund
She launched the Mayor’s Disaster Relief Fund for COVID-19 on 16 April 2020, raising over $5 million to help individuals, small businesses, and nonprofit organizations.

Awards
2020: NAACP award 
2021: Women's Bar Association of Massachusetts Emerging Women Leaders in the Law award 
2021: South Asian Bar Association 2021 Member of the Year 
2021: Margaret Fuller House Gala award 
2021: Greater Boston Labor Council Labor Champion award.

References

1988 births
American people of Pakistani descent
American politicians of Pakistani descent
Living people
Mayors of Cambridge, Massachusetts
American mayors of Asian descent
Brown University alumni
Politicians from Cambridge, Massachusetts
Cambridge Rindge and Latin School alumni
Pakistani emigrants to the United States